The Lumsden Baronetcy, of Auchindour in the County of Aberdeen, was a title in the Baronetage of the United Kingdom.  It was created on 9 August 1821 for Sir Harry Niven-Lumsden. He had already been knighted in 1816.  Lumsden had no legitimate surviving male issue and the title became extinct on his early death in December 1821, having held the title for only four months.

Lumsden baronets, of Auchindour (1821)
Sir Harry Niven Lumsden, 1st Baronet (died 15 December 1821)

References

Extinct baronetcies in the Baronetage of the United Kingdom
1821 establishments in England